Genoa is a city in Italy.

Genova may also refer to:

 Genova (1953 film), a 1953 Malayalam film directed by F Nagoor
 Genova (2008 film), a 2008 Michael Winterbottom film
 Genova (grape), another name for the Australian wine grape Emperor
 Genova (newspaper 1639–1646), the first newspaper published in Italy
 Genova (newspaper 1642–1684), a 17th-century newspaper published in Genoa
 Genova (surname), a list of people whose surname is Genova
 , a passenger ship in service 1948-55

See also

 Genoese (disambiguation)
 Génova (disambiguation)
 Geneva (disambiguation)
 Genoa (disambiguation)
 Genua (disambiguation)
 Jenova (disambiguation)